Chichester South is an electoral ward of Chichester District, West Sussex, England and returns two members to sit on Chichester District Council.

Councillors

Election results

* Elected

References

External links
 Chichester District Council
 Election Maps

Wards of Chichester District